In Greek mythology, Menoeceus (Ancient Greek: Μενοικεύς Menoikeús "strength of the house" derived from menos "strength" and oikos "house") was the name of two Theban characters. They are related by genealogy, the first being the grandfather of the second. 
 Menoeceus, father of Creon, Jocasta and Hipponome and both grandfather and father-in-law of Oedipus. He was the Theban son of Pentheus and a descendant of the Spartoi through his grandfather Echion.
 Menoeceus, son of Creon and possibly Eurydice, named after his grandfather. According to Hyginus and Statius, during the reign of Eteocles when the Seven against Thebes laid siege to the city, Creon's son committed suicide by throwing himself from the walls. This was in concordance with Tiresias foretelling that if anyone of the Spartoi should perish freely as sacrifice to Ares, Thebes would be freed from disaster. The Thebans were ultimately victorious. The battle is memorialized in Seven Against Thebes, the play by Aeschylus. Some records say that that Menoeceus was the grandfather of Creon and Jocasta and his son (Creon and Jocasta's father) was named Oscalus. The Greek writer Pausanias visited the site of Menoeceus tomb in the 2nd century AD and recorded that Menoeceus committed suicide "in obedience to the oracle from Delphi, at the time when Polyneices and the host with him arrived from Argos. On the tomb of Menoeceus grows a pomegranate-tree. If you break through the outer part of the ripe fruit, you will then find the inside like blood. This pomegranate-tree is still flourishing."

A later Menoeceus was a contemporary of Epicurus, to whom the philosopher wrote a letter summarizing his ethical doctrines.

Notes

References 

 Euripides, The Complete Greek Drama, edited by Whitney J. Oates and Eugene O'Neill, Jr. in two volumes. 2. Phoenissae, translated by Robert Potter. New York. Random House. 1938. Online version at the Perseus Digital Library.
 Euripides, Euripidis Fabulae. vol. 3. Gilbert Murray. Oxford. Clarendon Press, Oxford. 1913. Greek text available at the Perseus Digital Library.
 Gaius Julius Hyginus, Fabulae from The Myths of Hyginus translated and edited by Mary Grant. University of Kansas Publications in Humanistic Studies. Online version at the Topos Text Project.
 Pausanias, Description of Greece with an English Translation by W.H.S. Jones, Litt.D., and H.A. Ormerod, M.A., in 4 Volumes. Cambridge, MA, Harvard University Press; London, William Heinemann Ltd. 1918. Online version at the Perseus Digital Library
 Pausanias, Graeciae Descriptio. 3 vols. Leipzig, Teubner. 1903.  Greek text available at the Perseus Digital Library.
 Pseudo-Apollodorus, The Library with an English Translation by Sir James George Frazer, F.B.A., F.R.S. in 2 Volumes, Cambridge, MA, Harvard University Press; London, William Heinemann Ltd. 1921. Online version at the Perseus Digital Library. Greek text available from the same website.
 Publius Papinius Statius, The Thebaid translated by John Henry Mozley. Loeb Classical Library Volumes. Cambridge, MA, Harvard University Press; London, William Heinemann Ltd. 1928. Online version at the Topos Text Project.
 Publius Papinius Statius, The Thebaid. Vol I-II. John Henry Mozley. London: William Heinemann; New York: G.P. Putnam's Sons. 1928. Latin text available at the Perseus Digital Library.
 William Smith. A Dictionary of Greek and Roman biography and mythology. s.v. Mienoecelus 1 and Mienoecelus 2. London (1848)

Theban characters in Greek mythology
Suicides in Greek mythology